Palam B Stadium or Model Sports Complex is a cricket ground in Palam, New Delhi. The ground was established in 1996. The ground is home ground of the Services cricket team. Till date, the ground has hosted  10 List A matches  and 10 Twenty20 matches.

See also
 Palam A Stadium

References

External links 
 Cricinfo
 Cricketachive

Sports venues in Delhi
Cricket grounds in Delhi
Sports venues completed in 1996
1996 establishments in Delhi
20th-century architecture in India